Bang! is the third studio album by British group World Party, released by Ensign Records on 20 April 1993.

Overview
While previous World Party albums were essentially solo projects by multi-instrumentalist Karl Wallinger, for this album World Party officially became a three-person group: Wallinger (vocals, keyboards, guitars, basses, etc.), Dave Catlin-Birch (guitars), and Chris Sharrock (drums). As well, the band is aided by a number of guest artists.

Release
In 2000, the album was re-released by Papillon Records with new cover art. Since 2000 the reissues omitted the track "Give It All Away (Reprise)".

Track listing
All songs written by Karl Wallinger, except where noted.
 "Kingdom Come" – 5:27
 "Is It Like Today?" – 5:11
 "What Is Love All About?" – 4:06
 "And God Said..." (Wallinger, Guy Chambers) – 0:26
 "Give It All Away" – 4:23
 "Sooner or Later" – 4:34
 "Hollywood" – 4:09
 "Radio Days" (Wallinger, Chambers, David Catlin-Birch) – 4:53
 "Rescue Me" – 6:06
 "Sunshine" – 4:31
 "All I Gave" – 3:47
 "Give It All Away (Reprise)"
Notes:

Charts

References

1993 albums
World Party albums